Modiolus capax, common name fat horsemussel, is a species of "horse mussel", a marine bivalve mollusc in the family Mytilidae, the mussels.  It was first described to science by American malacologist Timothy Abbott Conrad in 1837. The type specimen was collected in San Diego by Thomas Nuttall.

Fossils of Modiolus capax have been found in Miocene epoch deposits, suggesting that this species is between 5.3 and 20.4 million years old.

Description

This species has a quite variable form, but it always shows serrate hairs on the periostracum. The left valve is more inflated than the right one. The external surface of the shell is blue to bright orange brown, while the inside is reddish-violet on the posterior half.

Distribution
This species is present in Santa Cruz, California, to Playa, Peru and in Galapagos Islands.  It is found throughout the Gulf of California.  Fat horsemussels live is shallow water from the intertidal zone to 25 fathoms.  They live on rocks, boulders, and pebbles on the sea bottom and attached to wood pilings.  Occasionally they can be found partially buried in mud.

Life history 
Fat horse mussels are gonochoric, that is to say that there are two sexes and each individual is either male or female. The reproduce by broadcast spawning, by releasing gametes into the sea where fertilization takes place. In laboratory conditions, a free-swimming veliger develops about 24 hours after fertilization, which develops an umbo about four days later. Settlement to the bottom takes place 3 to 4 days later.

This species is a filter feeder, drawing seawater into its body where it filters out nutrients.  It then ejects excess water and waste products into the sea.

Human consumption 
Local consumption of fat horsemussels takes place in coastal communities.  The cultivation of Modiolus capax in aquaculture has been studied since the 1980s.  Among the findings were that this species does not readily settle on the artificial substrates used by the industry and that it is relatively slow-growing.  Consequently, this species is among the least promising for aquaculture.

References

 Coan, E. V.; Valentich-Scott, P. (2012). Bivalve seashells of tropical West America. Marine bivalve mollusks from Baja California to northern Peru. 2 vols, 1258 pp.

capax
Bivalves described in 1837